Ruane is a surname. Notable people with the surname include:

Billy Ruane (1957–2010), Boston, Massachusetts, United States, music promoter, and the son of investment manager William J. Ruane
Caitríona Ruane MLA (born 1962), Sinn Féin politician and a member of the Northern Ireland Assembly for South Down
Chris Ruane (born 1958), Welsh Labour Party politician who has been the Member of Parliament (MP) for the Vale of Clwyd since 1997
Frances P. Ruane, director of the Economic and Social Research Institute (ESRI) in Dublin, Ireland
J. Michael Ruane (born 1927), American politician who represented the 7th Essex district in the Massachusetts House of Representatives
James Ruane, Irish Gaelic footballer
John Ruane (1936–2006), American jockey in thoroughbred horse racing
Martin Ruane (1946–1998), English professional wrestler of Irish descent better known as Giant Haystacks
Paul Ruane, former Republican member of the Pennsylvania House of Representatives
Seán Ruane, Irish politician
William "Skippy" Rohan (1871–1916), American gangster born William Ruane
Terry Ruane (born 1946), English actor and director who became profoundly deaf as a result of meningitis at the age of five
Thomas Ruane, Irish politician
Tom Ruane, Captain of the Second Western Division of the Irish Republican Army, from 1916 to 1920
William J. Ruane (1925–2005), Wall Street investment manager and philanthropist
William Ruane (born 1985), Scottish actor
Willie Ruane (born 1975), Irish rugby player

See also
Ruane, Cunniff & Goldfarb based in New York City is the investment firm founded in 1969 by William J. Ruane and Richard T. Cunniff